Telta railway station is a railway station on Katihar–Siliguri branch of Howrah–New Jalpaiguri line in the Katihar railway division of Northeast Frontier Railway zone. It is situated beside State Highway 65 at Rupauli, Telta of Katihar district in the Indian state of Bihar.

References

Railway stations in Katihar district
Katihar railway division